The Sea of Okhotsk is a marginal sea of the western Pacific Ocean. It is located between Russia's Kamchatka Peninsula on the east, the Kuril Islands on the southeast, Japan's island of Hokkaido on the south, the island of Sakhalin along the west, and a stretch of eastern Siberian coast along the west and north. The northeast corner is the Shelikhov Gulf. The sea is named after the Okhota river, which is in turn named after the Even word  meaning "river".

Geography

It is connected to the Sea of Japan on either side of Sakhalin: on the west through the Sakhalin Gulf and the Gulf of Tartary; on the south through the La Pérouse Strait.

In winter, navigation on the Sea of Okhotsk is impeded by ice floes. Ice floes form due to the large amount of freshwater from the Amur River, lowering the salinity of upper levels, often raising the freezing point of the sea surface. The distribution and thickness of ice floes depends on many factors: the location, the time of year, water currents, and the sea temperatures.

Cold air from Siberia forms sea ice in the northwestern Sea of Okhotsk. As the ice forms, it expels salt into the deeper layers. This heavy water flows east toward the Pacific, carrying oxygen and nutrients, supporting abundant sea life. The Sea of Okhotsk has warmed in some places by as much as 3°C (5.4°F) since preindustrial times, three times faster than the global mean. Warming inhibits the formation of sea ice and also drives fish populations north. The salmon catch on the northern Japanese coast has fallen 70% in the last 15 years, while the Russian chum salmon catch has quadrupled.

With the exception of Hokkaido, one of the Japanese home islands, the sea is surrounded on all sides by territory administered by the Russian Federation. South Sakhalin and the Kuril Islands were administered by Japan until 1945. Japan claims the southern Kuril Islands and refers to them as Northern Territories.

Extent
The International Hydrographic Organization defines the limits of the Sea of Okhotsk as follows:

Islands
Some of the Sea of Okhotsk's islands are quite large, including Japan's second-largest island, Hokkaido, as well as Russia's largest island, Sakhalin. Practically all of the sea's islands are either in coastal waters or belong to the various islands making up the Kuril Islands chain. These fall either under undisputed Japanese or Russian ownership or disputed ownership between Japan and Russia. Iony Island is the only island located in open waters and belongs to the Khabarovsk Krai of the Russian Federation. The majority of the sea's islands are uninhabited, making them ideal breeding grounds for seals, sea lions, seabirds, and other sea island fauna. Large colonies, with over a million individuals, of crested auklets use the Sea of Okhotsk as a nesting site.

History

Pre-modern
The Okhotsk people and the later Ainu culture, a coastal fishing and hunter-gatherer people, were located around the lands surrounding the Sea of Okhotsk, as well as in northern Japan.

European exploration and settlement
Russian explorers Ivan Moskvitin and Vassili Poyarkov were the first Europeans to visit the Sea of Okhotsk (and, probably, the island of Sakhalin) in the 1640s. The Dutch captain Maarten Gerritsz Vries in the Breskens entered the Sea of Okhotsk from the south-east in 1643, and charted parts of the Sakhalin coast and Kuril Islands, but failed to realize that either Sakhalin or Hokkaido are islands. During this period, the sea was sometimes known as the Sea of Kamchatka.

The first and foremost Russian settlement on the shore was the port of Okhotsk, which relinquished commercial supremacy to Ayan in the 1840s. The Russian-American Company all but monopolized the commercial navigation of the sea in the first half of the 19th century.

The Second Kamchatka Expedition under Vitus Bering systematically mapped the entire coast of the sea, starting in 1733. Jean-François de Galaup, comte de Lapérouse and William Robert Broughton were the first non-Russian European navigators known to have passed through these waters other than Vries. Ivan Krusenstern explored the eastern coast of Sakhalin in 1805. Mamiya Rinzō and Gennady Nevelskoy determined that Sakhalin was indeed an island separated from the mainland by a narrow strait. The first detailed summary of the hydrology of the Sea of Okhotsk was prepared and published by Stepan Makarov in 1894.

Fishing
The Sea of Okhotsk is one of the world's richest in biological resources, with various kinds of fish, shellfish and crabs.

The harsh conditions of crab fishing in the Sea of Okhotsk is the subject of the most famous novel of the Japanese writer Takiji Kobayashi, The Crab Cannery Ship (1929).

The Peanut Hole 

Since the Peanut Hole was not in the Russian EEZ, any country could fish there, and some began doing so in large numbers in 1991, catching perhaps as much as one million metric tons of pollock in 1992. This was seen by the Russian Federation as presenting a danger to Russian fish stocks, since the fish move in and out of the Peanut Hole from the Russian EEZ.

The Russian Federation petitioned the United Nations to declare the Peanut Hole to be part of Russia's continental shelf. In November 2013, a United Nations subcommittee accepted the Russian argument, and in March 2014 the full United Nations Commission on the Limits of the Continental Shelf ruled in favor of the Russian Federation.

Whaling
Bowhead whales were first caught in 1847, and dominated the catch between 1852 and the late 1860s. Between 1850 and 1853 the majority of the fleet went to the Bering Strait region to hunt bowheads, but intense competition, poor ice conditions, and declining catches forced the fleet back to the Sea of Okhotsk. From 1854 to 1856, an average of over 160 vessels cruised in the sea each year. As catches declined between 1858 and 1860 the fleet shifted back to the Bering Strait region.

Modern
South Sakhalin was administered by Japan as Karafuto Prefecture from 1907 to 1949. The Kuril Islands were Japanese from 1855 and 1875 till the end of World War II in 1945. Afterward, the Soviet Union occupied the territory.

During the Cold War, the Sea of Okhotsk was the scene of several successful U.S. Navy operations (including Operation Ivy Bells) to tap Soviet Navy undersea communications cables. These operations were documented in the book Blind Man's Bluff: The Untold Story of American Submarine Espionage. The sea (and surrounding area) were also the scene of the Soviet attack on Korean Air Lines Flight 007 in 1983. The Soviet Pacific Fleet used the sea as a ballistic missile submarine bastion, a strategy that Russia continues.

Oil and gas exploration
Twenty-nine zones of possible oil and gas accumulation have been identified on the Sea of Okhotsk shelf, which runs along the coast. Total reserves are estimated at 3.5 billion tons of equivalent fuel, including 1.2 billion tons of oil and 1.5 billion cubic meters of gas.

Reportedly, its pumps failed, causing it to take on water and sink. The platform carried 67 people, of which 14 were rescued by the Magadan and the tugboat Natftogaz-55. The platform was subcontracted to a company working for the Russian energy giant Gazprom.

Notable seaports
 Magadan, Magadan, Russia; population: 95,000
 Palana, Kamchatka, Russia; population: 3,000
 Abashiri, Hokkaido, Japan; population: 38,000
 Monbetsu, Hokkaido, Japan; population: 25,000
 Wakkanai, Hokkaido, Japan; population: 38,000

See also
 100 Soundscapes of Japan
 Peanut Hole

Explanatory notes

References

External links

 Overview of Okhotsk region (PDF) 

 
Bodies of water of Kamchatka Krai
Bodies of water of Khabarovsk Krai
Bodies of water of Magadan Oblast
Bodies of water of Sakhalin Oblast
Geography of Hokkaido
Geography of Northeast Asia
Geography of the Russian Far East
Okhotsk
Pacific Coast of Russia
Okhotsk
Okhotsk
Temperate Northern Pacific